The Exotic Shorthair is a breed of cat developed as a short-haired version of the Persian. The Exotic is similar to the Persian in many ways, including temperament and conformation, a flat nose and face with the exceptions of the short dense coat.

In the late 1950s, the Persian was used as an outcross by some American Shorthair breeders. This was done in secret in order to improve their body type, and crosses were also made with the Russian Blue and the Burmese. The crossbreed look gained recognition in the show ring, but unhappy American Shorthair breeders successfully produced a new breed standard that would disqualify American Shorthairs that showed signs of crossbreeding. One American Shorthair breeder who saw the potential of the Persian/American Shorthair cross proposed and eventually got the Cat Fanciers' Association judge and American Shorthair breeder Jane Martinke to recognize them as a new breed in 1966, under the name Exotic Shorthair. In 1987, the Cat Fanciers' Association closed the Exotic to shorthair outcrosses, leaving Persian as the only allowable outcross breed.

Because of the regular use of Persian as outcrosses, some Exotics may carry a copy of the recessive longhair gene. When two such cats mate, there is a 1 in 4 chance of each offspring being longhaired. Longhaired Exotics are not considered Persians by the Cat Fanciers' Association, although The International Cat Association accepts them as Persians. Other associations like the American Cat Fanciers Association register them as a separate Exotic Longhair breed.

Description 

The Exotic Shorthair meets every standard for the Persian breed, except for the coat.
Head: Oval, massive. Very broad skull. Rounded forehead. Round, full cheeks. Short, broad, round muzzle. Short, broad nose with pronounced stop، Strong chin. Broad, powerful jaws.
Ears: Small, rounded at the tip, not too open at the base. Widely spaced and well-furnished with hair on the inside.
Eyes: Large and round. Pure, deep color corresponding to that of the coat (gold to copper in most varieties; green in the chinchilla and the golden; blue in the white and the colorpoint).
Neck: Short and thick.
Body: Medium-sized, cobby, low to the ground. Broad chest. Massive shoulders. Large-boned with powerful muscles. Weight: 3.5 – 6 kilograms.
Paw: Short, straight and large. Round, large paws. Tufts of hair between the toes.
Tail: Short, thick, carried low. Rounded tip.
Coat: Shorthaired but slightly longer than other shorthaired breeds. Dense, fluffy, erect hair. All Persian colors are recognized.

Characteristics 

Exotic Shorthairs have a gentle and calm personality reminiscent of the Persian, but are generally livelier than their longhaired ancestors. Curious and playful, they are friendly to other cats and dogs, but they don't like being left alone and need the presence of their owner. They tend to show more affection and loyalty than most breeds and make excellent lap cats. Their calm, steady nature makes them ideal apartment cats for city dwellers. Nonetheless, Exotics retain some of the energetic spark of the American Shorthair, and they are often capable mouse hunters.

Care and grooming 

Unlike the high-maintenance Persian, the Exotic is able to keep its own fur tidy with little human assistance, though weekly brushing and combing is recommended to remove loose hair and reduce shedding and hairballs.

The Exotic Shorthair personality can simply be described as calm and friendly. Due in part to their easy-going nature, these felines acclimate well to apartment or household environments, and they enjoy being around kids and adults.

As with other flat-faced animals, the Exotic's tear ducts are prone to overflowing due to the nasolacrimal duct, which can dampen and stain the face. This can be relieved by periodically wiping the cat's face with a cloth moistened with water or one of the commercial preparations made expressly for the purpose.

This breed ages slowly, as it does not reach maturity until around two years of age and enters puberty fairly late. When two Exotic Shorthairs are crossed, they may produce long-haired kittens called "Exotic Longhairs" by the Cat Fanciers' Association. Externally, they look like Persians.

Health

The Exotic Shorthair is a brachycephalous breed, meaning that its problems result from having the nose and eyes in close proximity to each other, giving the appearance of a pushed-in face. As well as issues with the tear ducts, sinus problems can also occur. Due to the shortened jaw, there is a chance of tooth misalignment or tooth crowding.

 Brachycephalic airway obstructive syndrome. Also referred to as brachycephalic respiratory syndrome or congenital obstructive upper airway disease, this causes upper airway abnormalities ranging in severity. The syndrome can cause increased airway resistance, inflammation of structures in the airways, and increased strain on the heart. Treatment includes weight loss, surgery, and avoiding humid or hot conditions.
 Calcium oxalate urolithiasis. A stone that crystallizes in the bladder and kidney.
 Corneal sequestrum. A necrosis of the cornea of unknown origin.
 Dystocia. An abnormal labor due to large-domed skulls.
 Feline polycystic kidney disease (PKD). Exotic Shorthairs, as well as Persians and other Persian-derived cats, have a high chance of inheriting PKD, a disease that can lead to kidney failure. Several studies using ultrasound scan screening have shown that the prevalence of PKD in Exotics is between 40 and 50% in developed nations. DNA screening for PKD is recommended for all Exotic cats used in breeding programs to reduce the incidence of kidney disease by spaying and neutering PKD positive cats.

Recognition 
The Exotic has steadily gained popularity among cat fanciers with the help of the devoted advocates of the breed who saw the value in a Persian and Shorthair crossbreed. 
 In 1967, the Exotic Shorthair was first accepted for Championship status by the Cat Fanciers' Association. 
 In 1971, the first Exotic Shorthair achieved the status of Grand Champion. 
 In 1986, the Fédération Internationale Féline recognized the Exotic Shorthair. 
 In 1991, an Exotic was the Cat Fanciers' Association's Cat of the Year.
 In 1992, the Cat Fanciers' Association's Best Kitten was an Exotic.

References

External links
 Cat Fanciers Association Exotic Breed Council
 

Cat breeds
Cat breeds originating in the United States
Inbred animals